Foxe Basin is a shallow oceanic basin north of Hudson Bay, in Nunavut, Canada, located between Baffin Island and the Melville Peninsula. For most of the year, it is blocked by sea ice (fast ice) and drift ice made up of multiple ice floes.

The nutrient-rich cold waters found in the basin are known to be especially favourable to phytoplankton and the numerous islands within it are important bird habitats, including Sabine's gulls and many types of shorebirds. Bowhead whales migrate to the northern part of the basin each summer.

The basin takes its name from the English explorer Luke Foxe who entered the lower part in 1631.

Waterway 
During much of the year, landfast ice dominates in the north, while pack ice prevails towards the south. Foxe Basin itself is rarely ice-free until September, open pack ice being common throughout the summer. Vigorous tidal currents and strong winds keep the ice pack in constant motion and contribute to the numerous polynyas and shore leads which are found throughout the region. This same motion, combined with the high sediment content of the water makes the sea ice of Foxe Basin dark and rough, easily distinguishable from other ice in the Canadian Arctic.

Foxe Basin is connected to the Gulf of Boothia via the narrow Fury and Hecla Strait, and to Hudson Bay and Hudson Strait via the wide Foxe Channel. It is also connected to Repulse Bay and Roes Welcome Sound via Frozen Strait.

Coast 
The terrain is rocky and rugged in the southern half of the region, and generally low-lying in the north. High cliffs are found across the southern portion of the region, where most of the seabirds nest.

Wildlife

This is one of the little-known areas of the Canadian Arctic, though it is proving to be biologically rich and diverse. The numerous polynyas in northern Foxe Basin support high densities of bearded seals and the largest walrus herd in Canada (over 6,000 individuals). Ringed seal and polar bear are common, with north Southampton Island as one of the highest-density polar bear denning areas in Canada.

This area is also an important summering area for the bowhead whale, beluga whale and narwhal. Both bowhead whales and belugas winter in the waters of northeastern Hudson Bay. Bowheads were the only known baleen whales to occur in the Hudson Bay, but recently some other species of whale, such as humpback and minke, are confirmed to migrate into the waters as well.

The region is the main North American stronghold of the Sabine's gull, with some 10,000 pairs nesting here. Moderate numbers of black guillemots, Arctic terns and glaucous, herring and ivory gulls also breed here. The Great Plain of the Koukdjuak on Baffin Island is the world's largest goose nesting colony, with upwards of 1.5 million birds, 75 percent of which are lesser snow geese and the remainder Canada and brant geese. Shorebirds and ducks are also abundant. Several hundred thousand thick-billed murres breed on the cliffs of Digges Sound and Coats Island to the south.

Status
This region is not yet represented in the national marine conservation areas system. Studies to identify preliminary representative marine areas have yet to be undertaken.

References

Further reading

 Anders, G. Northern Foxe Basin An Area Economic Survey. Ottawa: Industrial Division, Northern Administration Branch, Dept. of Northern Affairs and National Resources, 1965. 
 Campbell, N. J., and A. E. Collin. The Discolouration of Foxe Basin Ice. [S.l.]: Atlantic Oceanographic Group, 1957. 
 Colby WB, and JF Cleall. 1974. "Cephalometric Analysis of the Craniofacial Region of the Northern Foxe Basin Eskimo". American Journal of Physical Anthropology. 40, no. 2: 159–70. 
 Cosens, Susan E., and Andries Blouw. Age Classes of Bowhead Whales Summering in Northern Foxe Basin. Ottawa: Fisheries and Oceans, 1999. 
 Crowe, Keith J. A Cultural Geography of Northern Foxe Basin, N.W.T. Ottawa: Northern Science Research Group, Dept. of Indian Affairs and Northern Development, 1969. 
 Fisher, K I, and R E A Stewart. 1997. "Summer Foods of Atlantic Walrus, Odobenus Rosmarus Rosmarus, in Northern Foxe Basin, Northwest Territories". Canadian Journal of Zoology. 75, no. 7: 1166. 
 Forgeron, F. D. A Preliminary Study of Foxe Basin Bottom Sediments. [S.l.]: Atlantic Oceanographic Group, 1959. 
 Gaston, Anthony J., Stephen A. Smith, Robert Saunders, G. Ilya Storm, and Jane A. Whitney. 2007. "Birds and Marine Mammals in Southwestern Foxe Basin, Nunavut, Canada". Polar Record. 43, no. 1: 33–47. 
 Geological Survey of Canada. Northern Foxe Basin. Open file (Geological Survey of Canada), 2382. 1992. 
 Greisman, Paul. Tidal Propagation Measurements in Foxe Basin. Canadian contractor report of hydrography and ocean sciences, no. 18. [Ottawa?]: Atlantic Region, Canadian Hydrographic Service, Ocean Science and Surveys, Atlantic, 1984.
 Manning, T. H. The Foxe Basin Coasts of Baffin Island. Geographical Journal, Vol.101,No.5-6. 1943. 
 Northwest Territories. Foxe Basin Polar Bear Research Program ... Field Report. [Yellowknife?]: Northwest Territories Resources, Wildlife & Economic Development, 1984. 

 
Landforms of Baffin Island
Oceanic basins of the Arctic Ocean
Landforms of Qikiqtaaluk Region
Canadian Arctic Archipelago